Wacker Drive is a major multilevel street in Chicago, Illinois, running along the south side of the main branch and the east side of the south branch of the Chicago River in the Loop.  The vast majority of the street is double-decked; the upper level intended for local traffic, and the lower level for through-traffic and trucks serving buildings on the road (and originally a dock). It is sometimes cited as a precursor to the modern freeway, though when it was built the idea was that pleasure vehicles would use the upper level. It is the only street in the city that is prefixed with all four cardinal directions, albeit on different parts of its route.  The drive is named for early 20th century Chicago businessman and city planner Charles H. Wacker.

The upper level is normally known as Upper Wacker Drive and the lower level is Lower Wacker Drive. A short part has a third level, sometimes called Lower Lower Wacker Drive or Sub Lower Wacker Drive.

History

In 1909, architects Daniel Burnham and Edward H. Bennett drew up a plan for the Commercial Club of Chicago to unify the city's urban design and increase its physical beautification. The improvement of traffic flow in Chicago was a major part of the plan. Among its many recommendations was a double-decked roadway along the river, intended to relieve the congestion at River Street and Rush Street, where 50% of the city's north–south traffic crossed the Chicago River. Charles H. Wacker, chairman of the Chicago Plan Commission, pushed the idea.

The original double-decker road, replacing South Water and River Streets, was completed in 1926 at a cost of $8 million and named after Charles Wacker. The 1926 section stretched from Lake Street to Michigan Avenue, the latter of which was also rebuilt into a two-level road.

An extension south to Congress Parkway and Harrison Street was built between 1948 and 1954, replacing Market Street (after the Market Street stub of the Lake Street Elevated was removed). Extensions east were built in 1963 and 1975, with the latter taking it to Lake Shore Drive, and a new lower level starting at Stetson Avenue. At the time, Lake Shore Drive had an S-curve at the river, running where Wacker now goes between Field Boulevard and current Lake Shore Drive. This S-curve was on a viaduct over the Illinois Central Railroad's rail yard, and was at the level of Upper Wacker; the middle and lower levels dead-ended at that point. The current alignment of Lake Shore Drive was finished in 1986, and in 1987 Middle Wacker was extended to meet the new alignment. The ramps to bring upper traffic down had already been built; upper has been dead-ended where it used to end at Lake Shore Drive.

In 2001–2002, Wacker Drive was redesigned and reconstructed between Michigan Avenue and Lake Street.  The original upper deck was crumbling, and the entire roadway did not meet modern standards for road widths and clearances.  Using a specially-developed post-tensioned, reinforced, high-performance concrete cast-in-place system, the new road deck was expected to have a lifespan of 75–100 years. Walkways along the river were meant to make the drive more pedestrian-friendly, while restoration of historic limestone elements and reproduction lighting evoked the drive's original 1926 appearance.  The 20-month, $200-million project was completed on time and within budget.

In spring of 2010, work commenced on rebuilding the north-south section of Wacker, from Randolph Street to Congress Parkway, including the upper and lower levels.  This is a continuation of the Revive Wacker Drive project started in 2001.

Wacker is the only street to intersect both State Street (the east–west center line) and Madison Street (the north–south center line), although Lake Shore Drive and LaSalle Street/Drive also each cross both dividing lines.

In April 2014, The American Council of Engineering Companies awarded the Wacker Drive and Congress Parkway Reconstruction project its Grand Conceptor Award. The project team was led by TranSystems and included roadway, bridge and tunnel improvement work. The project involved complex staging to keep 135,000 vehicles and 150,000 pedestrians moving through the construction zone each day.

Intersections
The following streets intersect Upper Wacker Drive, from south to north and west to east. Most upper-level streets that end at Wacker Drive, with only right turns allowed, are not included.

The following streets intersect Lower Wacker Drive, from south to north and west to east.

In popular media
 The 1980 film The Blues Brothers used Wacker Drive as a setting.
 The car chase scene in The Dark Knight (2008) was filmed on Lower Wacker Drive. 
 The music video for "Burnin'" pays tribute to Chicago house producers that Daft Punk found inspiration in.

Gallery

See also
Multilevel streets in Chicago
Philo Carpenter
 Buildings on Wacker Drive
Blue Cross-Blue Shield Building
Civic Opera House
One South Wacker
111 South Wacker Drive
200 South Wacker Drive
Willis Tower
311 South Wacker Drive
333 Wacker Drive
225 West Wacker Drive

Explanatory notes

References

External links
Official City of Chicago Loop Community Map 

Streets in Chicago